Baykal is the name of several rural localities in Russia:
Baykal, Aurgazinsky District, Republic of Bashkortostan, a village in Balyklykulsky Selsoviet of Aurgazinsky District in the Republic of Bashkortostan
Baykal, Nurimanovsky District, Republic of Bashkortostan, a village in Nikolsky Selsoviet of Nurimanovsky District in the Republic of Bashkortostan
Baykal, Krasnoyarsk Krai, a settlement in Verkhnepashinsky Selsoviet of Yeniseysky District in Krasnoyarsk Krai
Baykal, Novosibirsk Oblast, a village in Bolotninsky District of Novosibirsk Oblast
Baykal, Omsk Oblast, a village in Syropyatsky Rural Okrug of Kormilovsky District in Omsk Oblast
Baykal, Primorsky Krai, a settlement in Pogranichny District of Primorsky Krai
Baykal, Arsky District, Republic of Tatarstan, a selo in Arsky District of the Republic of Tatarstan
Baykal, Vysokogorsky District, Republic of Tatarstan, a village in Vysokogorsky District of the Republic of Tatarstan
Baykal, Tyumen Oblast, a village in Novotroitsky Rural Okrug of Nizhnetavdinsky District in Tyumen Oblast

See also
Baykal (port), a rural locality (a settlement) in Slyudyansky District of Irkutsk Oblast